The Royals is an American television drama series aired on E! that debuted on March 15, 2015. The series began as a loose adaptation of the Michelle Ray novel Falling for Hamlet, and each episode is named after a line of dialogue from William Shakespeare's Hamlet.
The series features a fictional contemporary British royal family as they deal with drama and scandals inside and outside of their family while in the public eye.

Series overview

Episodes

Season 1 (2015)

Season 2 (2015–16)

Season 3 (2016–17)

Season 4 (2018)

References

External links
 
 

Lists of American drama television series episodes